In Judaism, the five species of grain refer to five varieties of grain which have special status for a number of rituals. These species are commonly considered to be wheat, barley, oats, rye and spelt. However, some of these identifications are disputed.

Identity
The five species, with their Mishnaic Hebrew names, are as follows:
  – wheat
  – spelt, but modernly taken to refer to emmer wheat
  – barley
  – oats or two-rowed barley. The name literally means "fox ear". Rashi holds this to be oats, and Maimonides holds it to be a type of "wild barley," while Rabbi Nathan ben Abraham called it by its Arabic name  (Fox's spike).
  – rye, oats, or spelt. Its Arabic cognate,  refers to oats. According to Dr Yehudah Felix,  is spelt.

The Talmud groups them into two varieties of wheat and three varieties of barley.

Since European medieval times, Orthodox Jewry accepts the five grains as wheat, barley, oats, rye and spelt.

Other than the traditional translation, some researchers today propose that only the grain species native to the Land of Israel can become . This would rule out not only oats, but also rye (Secale) which grows in colder, wetter climates. They offer other translations to the 5 grains.

Laws
A number of laws apply only to these five grains:
 Only bread made with these grains requires the blessing of hamotzi before eating, and birkat hamazon after eating.
 Only bread made from these grain is obligated in challah.
 Matzah can only be made from these grains, and conversely only these grains can become chametz and seor.
 The prohibitions of eating and harvesting chadash only apply to these grains.

Oat matza

As mentioned above, oats are generally accepted in Ashkenazi Jewish tradition as the one of the five species, but modern research suggests that what has been traditionally translated as "oats" is in fact a wild species of barley or other grains. This debate is practically significant because of the candidates for the five species, oats are the only one which is gluten-free. Although there have been no changes to normative Jewish law to reflect the debate, some rabbis take a stringent view and discourage the use of oat matzo to fulfill the biblical obligation of eating matzo at the Passover Seder.

Additional species
According to Rabbi Johanan ben Nuri, rice and millet are also included among the "species of grain", and thus can become chametz and matza and are obligated in challah. This opinion was not accepted as halacha.

See also
 Four species
 Seven species
 List of Five grains in world culture

References

Jewish law and rituals
Plants in the Bible
Agriculture in Israel